Webstar Ndoli Lukose (born ) is a Kenyan male weightlifter, competing in the 77 kg category and representing Kenya at international competitions. He participated at the 2014 Commonwealth Games in the 77 kg event

Major competitions

References

1989 births
Living people
Kenyan male weightlifters
Weightlifters at the 2014 Commonwealth Games
Commonwealth Games competitors for Kenya
People from Kericho County